Vaughn Spann is a contemporary artist born in Florida in 1992. His style moves between abstraction and figuration, and at times incorporates symbols such as the American flag or the letter X.

Education and career 
Spann completed a BA in fine arts at Rutgers University in 2014, and an MA at the Yale School of Art in 2018. His work is held in institutions including the Pérez Art Museum Miami and the High Museum of Art, and has been shown at the Rubell Museum, the Pérez Art Museum and the Kemper Museum of Contemporary Art. In 2020 he was one of Forbes "30 Under 30 in Art and Style".

In 2020 he donated some proceeds from the sale of a print to Black Lives Matter.

He lives in Newark, New Jersey.

References

Further reading 

1992 births
Living people